K B Bhabha Hospital (popularly known as Bhabha Hospital) is a public hospital in Bandra (west) in Mumbai, India. It was established by the Municipal Corporation of Greater Mumbai.

Bhabha Hospital is one of the hospitals in the city where a huge number of accident or disaster victims turn up. It is behind Globus mall, on Waterfield Road, Bandra.

During the COVID-19 pandemic in India the hospital ran out of oxygen several times.

References 

Hospitals in Mumbai
Bandra
Municipal hospitals in India
Year of establishment missing